Kynurenic acid (KYNA or KYN) is a product of the normal metabolism of amino acid -tryptophan. It has been shown that kynurenic acid possesses neuroactive activity. It acts as an antiexcitotoxic and anticonvulsant, most likely through acting as an antagonist at excitatory amino acid receptors. Because of this activity, it may influence important neurophysiological and neuropathological processes. As a result, kynurenic acid has been considered for use in therapy in certain neurobiological disorders. Conversely, increased levels of kynurenic acid have also been linked to certain pathological conditions.

Kynurenic acid was discovered in 1853 by the German chemist Justus von Liebig in dog urine, which it was apparently named after.

It is formed from -kynurenine in a reaction catalyzed by the enzyme kynurenine—oxoglutarate transaminase.

Mechanism of action 
KYNA has been proposed to act on five targets:
 As an antagonist at ionotropic AMPA, NMDA and Kainate glutamate receptors in the concentration range of 0.1-2.5 mM.
 As a noncompetitive antagonist at the glycine site of the NMDA receptor. 
 As an antagonist of the α7 nicotinic acetylcholine receptor. However, recently (2011) direct recording of α7 nicotinic acetylcholine receptor currents in adult (noncultured) hippocampal interneurons by the Cooper laboratory  validated a 2009 study that failed to find any blocking effect of kynurenic acid across a wide range of concentrations, thus suggesting that in noncultured, intact preparations from adult animals there is no effect of kynurenic acid on α7 nicotinic acetylcholine receptor currents.
 As a ligand for the orphan G protein-coupled receptor GPR35. 
 As an agonist for the G protein-coupled receptor HCAR3.

Role in disease
High levels of kynurenic acid have been identified in patients with tick-borne encephalitis, schizophrenia and HIV-related illnesses. In all these situations, increased levels were associated with confusion and psychotic symptoms. Kynurenic acid acts in the brain as a glycine-site NMDAr antagonist, key in glutamatergic neurotransmission system, which is thought to be involved in the pathophysiology and pathogenesis of schizophrenia.

The kynurenic acid hypothesis of schizophrenia was proposed in 2007, based on its action on midbrain dopamine activity and NMDArs, thus linking dopamine hypothesis of schizophrenia with the glutamate hypothesis of the disease.

Kynurenic acid is reduced in individuals with mood disorders, such as major depressive disorder and bipolar disorder, especially during depressive episodes.

High levels of kynurenic acid have been identified in human urine in certain metabolic disorders, such as marked pyridoxine deficiency and deficiency/absence of kynureninase.

When researchers decreased the levels of kynurenic acid in the brains of mice, their cognition was shown to improve markedly. However, kynurenic acid also shows neuroprotective properties. Some researchers have posited that the increased levels found in cases of neurological degradation is due to a failed attempt to protect the cells.

Elevated levels of kynurenic acid compared to kynurenine appear to be associated with poorer T cell response and higher mortality in male subjects with COVID-19, suggesting an explanation for the poorer clinical outcomes observed in males than in females.

Link to ketogenic diet 
One controlled study kept mice on a ketogenic diet and measured kynurenic acid concentrations in different parts of the brain. It found that the mice on the ketogenic diet had greater kynurenic acid concentrations in the striatum and hippocampus compared to mice on a normal diet, with no significant difference in the cortex.

In response to the studies showing detrimental behaviour following increases in kynurenic acid the authors also note that the diet was generally well tolerated by the animals, with no "gross behavioural abnormalities". They posit that the increases in concentrations found were insufficient to produce behavioural changes seen in those studies.

See also 
 Xanthurenic acid

References

External links 
Link found between TBE and schizophrenia - TheLocal.se, Sweden's news in English, 6 November 2007.

AMPA receptor antagonists
Aromatic acids
Hydroxy acids
Kainate receptor antagonists
Nicotinic antagonists
NMDA receptor antagonists
Quinolinols